Ian Jack Wadsworth (born 24 September 1966 in Huddersfield) is a former professional footballer, who played for Huddersfield Town and Doncaster Rovers. He now has links to the newly formed Holmfirth Town F.C.

References

1966 births
Living people
English footballers
Footballers from Huddersfield
Association football forwards
English Football League players
Huddersfield Town A.F.C. players
Doncaster Rovers F.C. players